Dosch is a surname. Notable people with the surname include:

Henry E. Dosch (1841–1925), Civil War veteran 
Henry E. Dosch House
Lætitia Dosch (born 1980), French-Swiss actress, playwright, and director
Mark Dosch (born 1960), American politician
Tom Dosch, American football coach and player

See also
Bosch (surname)